The 1982–83 Bulgarian Cup was the 43rd season of the Bulgarian Cup. CSKA Sofia won the competition, beating Spartak Varna 4–0 in the final at the Plovdiv Stadium.

First round

|}

Second round

|}

Third round
In this round include the four teams, who participated in the European tournaments (CSKA, Levski, Slavia and Lokomotiv Sofia).

|}

Quarter-finals

|}

Semi-finals

Final

Details

References

1982-83
1982–83 domestic association football cups
Cup